Hemirhodon is a genus of trilobites that lived in the Cambrian, from the middle Cambrian to the Dresbachian.

References
 Paleobiology Database
 Sepkoski Online

Corynexochida genera
Dolichometopidae
Cambrian trilobites of North America
Paleozoic life of British Columbia

Cambrian genus extinctions